This list of the Pamantasan ng Lungsod ng Maynila alumni includes those who studied as undergraduate or graduate students, as well as those who were given honorary degrees at the University of the City of Manila since its formal opening on July 17, 1967.

Alumni and students
The table presents the partial list of outstanding alumni (also known as the PLMayers) and students of PLM.

Honorary graduates
Through the years, PLM has conferred the title of Doctor "honoris causa" (honorary degree) upon exemplary men and women who have contributed to the development of Philippine society through a distinct mark of excellence and leadership in their own fields of endeavor.

Alumni in fiction
The table presents the partial list of fictional characters associated with the PLM as depicted in works of art.

Notes

External links
PLM Official University Website
The Official Alumni Website
A Community Forum Website

Pamantasan
Manila